WZNG (1400 AM and 100.9 FM) broadcasting "Real. Classic. Rock.") is a radio station broadcasting a Classic Rock format. Licensed to Shelbyville, Tennessee, United States, the station is currently owned by David Hopkins, Lori Schuler, and Paul Hopkins, through licensee Hopkins Farms Broadcasting Inc.

References

External links
 

ZNG
Classic rock radio stations in the United States
Bedford County, Tennessee
Radio stations established in 1970
1970 establishments in Tennessee